The Coon Hollow Formation is a geologic formation in Idaho. It preserves fossils dating back to the Jurassic period.

See also

 List of fossiliferous stratigraphic units in Idaho
 Paleontology in Idaho

References
 

Jurassic Idaho
Jurassic geology of Oregon